(), better known by the stage name , is a Japanese voice actor affiliated with 81 Produce. Nezumi is best known for voicing K' in SNK's The King of Fighters franchise. He later changed his legal name to Nezumi on April 1, 1999.

Filmography

Anime
.hack//Roots (Pirokio)
Beyblade (Ralf)
Beyblade G Revolution (Ralf)
Boogiepop Phantom (Worker B (ep.5))
D.Gray-man (Pang)
Full Metal Panic! (Terrorist C (ep.11))
Gintama (Matsutarou)
Gravitation (Ken-chan)
Kaleido Star (Agent)
Kiba (Stonos)
Mouse (Male Employee (ep.8))
Petite Princess Yucie (Cat Soldier (ep.7))
Psychic Academy (Teruda)
Saiyuki Premium (Kougaiji)
Soul Hunter (Emperor Zhou)
Tenchi Muyo! GXP (Tarant Shank)
The King of Fighters: Another Day (K' (ep.3))
 Katekyo Hitman Reborn (G)

Video games
KOF: Maximum Impact (K')
Neo Geo Battle Coliseum (K')
The King of Fighters '99 (K')
The King of Fighters 2000 (K')
The King of Fighters 2001 (K')
The King of Fighters 2002 (K')
The King of Fighters 2003 (K')
The King of Fighters XI (K')
The King of Fighters XIII (K')
The King of Fighters Neowave (K')
The King of Fighters 2002: Unlimited Match (K')

Drama CD
Samurai Tamashii -Samurai Spirits- (Samurai)
Shinsetsu Samurai Spirits Bushido Retsuden (Thief)
The King of Fighters '96 (Soldier)
The King of Fighters '97 ~Shukumei Hen~ (Announcer)
The King of Fighters '97 ~Gekitotsu Hen~ (Man C)
The King of Fighters '98 (Radio DJ)
The King of Fighters '99 (K')
The King of Fighters 2000 (K')

References

External links
Data at 81Produce
 
 Yuuki Matsuda at GamePlaza-Haruka Voice Acting

81 Produce voice actors
Japanese male video game actors
Japanese male voice actors
Male voice actors from Tokyo Metropolis
Living people
20th-century Japanese male actors
21st-century Japanese male actors
Year of birth missing (living people)